Charles L. Caccia,  (April 28, 1930 – May 3, 2008) was a Canadian politician. Caccia was a Liberal member of the House of Commons of Canada. He represented the Toronto riding of Davenport between 1968 and 2004.

Background
Caccia was born in 1930 in Milan, Italy. He became a professor of forestry at the University of Toronto, and was a co-founder of COSTI in Toronto. Caccia's first wife, Mildred, was a candidate for the Ontario Liberal Party in a provincial election in the 1970s. They had two children, Nicolette and John, and were divorced. Caccia was survived by second wife Iva.

Politics
Caccia was best known for his strong pro-environment views on the left of the Liberal party. He served at various times during the ministries of Pierre Trudeau and John Turner as Minister of Labour, Minister of the Environment, Parliamentary Secretary to the Solicitor General of Canada, Parliamentary Secretary to the President of the Treasury Board, and Parliamentary Secretary to the Minister of Manpower and Immigration.  He most recently was the Chair of the Standing Committee on Environment and Sustainable Development, and of the subcommittee on Agenda and Procedure of the Standing Committee on Environment and Sustainable Development. Caccia was one of only three cabinet members to endorse Jean Chrétien in the 1984 Liberal Party of Canada leadership election, along with David Collenette and Roméo LeBlanc. He was the Liberals' Environment critic from 1984 to 1989, and spent most of the rest of his career on the backbench.

One of the most left-leaning Liberal Members of Parliament (MPs) of the time, he was known for his stances on environmental issues and his staunch opposition to the 2003 invasion of Iraq, he was one of the few Liberal MPs to back Sheila Copps in the Liberal Party's 2003 leadership election.  His left-leaning politics and support of Copps ended his political career when the more right-leaning Paul Martin became Liberal leader and prime minister in 2004. Martin backed former Toronto city councillor Mario Silva for the Liberal Party nomination in Davenport.  With Martin's support, Silva signed up enough new members until it was obvious he would defeat Caccia for the nomination.  Caccia pulled out of the race, and after some talk, chose to retire from politics rather than run as an independent or Green in the 2004 election.

In 1964, he was labelled as a communist by East York Mayor True Davidson for suggesting that Toronto city run day cares accept children from mothers in two parent working families. At the time, they only accepted children from single working mothers.

Electoral record

References

External links
COSTI. A History in Progress by Adriana Suppa

1930 births
2008 deaths
Canadian environmentalists
Canadian foresters
Forestry academics
Italian emigrants to Canada
Liberal Party of Canada MPs
Members of the 22nd Canadian Ministry
Members of the 23rd Canadian Ministry
Members of the House of Commons of Canada from Ontario
Members of the King's Privy Council for Canada
Toronto city councillors
Academic staff of the University of Toronto